Malva verticillata, also known as the Chinese mallow or cluster mallow, is a species of the mallow genus Malva in the family of Malvaceae found in East Asia from Pakistan to China. M. verticillata is an annual or biennial that grow up to 1.7 meters in high and can inhabit woodland areas of different soil types. The small, symmetrical flowers have five white, pink or red petals (0.8 cm) and 13 or more stamens. Each flower has 3 narrow epicalyx bracts. The fruit is a dry, hairless nutlet.  The leaves are simple and alternate.

In temperate climates, it flowers from July to September and the seeds from August to October. The flowers of the plant are self-fertile but can also be pollinated by insects.

Distribution
The species originates in Asia. It is widely distributed in Europe and is considered an invasive plant. It is also present in North America, including most states in the USA.

Uses
The plant was an important leaf vegetable in pre-Han China and widely cultivated. Mallow is mentioned in Huangdi Neijing as one of the five consumable herbs (五菜) which included mallow (葵), pea leaves (藿), Allium macrostemon (薤), Welsh onion (蔥) and Garlic chives (韭). It was deemed to be a major vegetable until the Northern Wei, supposedly. The technology for domesticating mallow was well recorded in Qimin Yaoshu. The acreages dwindled since the Tang dynasty. In his Nong Shu [Agricultural Manual], Wang Zhen wrote that mallow came top among various vegetables, because "it could be alternative in years of crop failure, or be marinated to serve with staples". There were rare occasions that people cultivated or consumed mallow during the Ming dynasty.

It is also grown as an ornamental plant.

References

External links
 
 
 

verticillata
Flora of temperate Asia
Plants described in 1753
Taxa named by Carl Linnaeus